Baseer Khan (born 4 November 2001) is an Afghan cricketer. He made his List A debut for Logar Province in the 2019 Afghanistan Provincial Challenge Cup tournament on 1 August 2019.

References

External links
 

2001 births
Living people
Afghan cricketers
Place of birth missing (living people)